"Jewel Song / Beside You: Boku o Yobu Koe"  is BoA's eighth Japanese single. It was on the 2003 top singles sales according to the Oricon with sales of 151,000. It is also her fourth highest selling single. Beside You -Boku wo Yobu Koe- was used as opening theme song for the anime Monkey Typhoon.

Track listing
 Jewel Song
 Beside You: Boku wo Yobu Koe
 Jewel Song (Instrumental)
 Beside You: Boku wo Yobu Koe (Instrumental)

Charts
Oricon Chart (Japan)

BoA songs
2002 singles
2000s ballads
Pop ballads
Torch songs